Đorđe Topalović (born 11 January 1977) is a Serbian former professional footballer who played as a goalkeeper.

Club career
Topalović was a member of Zemun for seven seasons (1997–2004). He subsequently went abroad and spent two years in Iran, with Esteghlal and Oghab Tehran. In the 2007 winter transfer window, Topalović returned to his homeland and joined OFK Beograd.

In 2008, Topalović played for Kazakhstan Premier League side Vostok, before returning to OFK Beograd in 2009.

International career
Topalović represented FR Yugoslavia at under-21 level.

References

External links

 
 
 

Association football goalkeepers
Azadegan League players
Esteghlal F.C. players
Expatriate footballers in Iran
Expatriate footballers in Kazakhstan
FC Vostok players
First League of Serbia and Montenegro players
FK Zemun players
Kazakhstan Premier League players
OFK Beograd players
People from Zemun
Persian Gulf Pro League players
Serbia and Montenegro expatriate footballers
Serbia and Montenegro footballers
Serbia and Montenegro under-21 international footballers
Serbian expatriate footballers
Serbian expatriate sportspeople in Iran
Serbian expatriate sportspeople in Kazakhstan
Serbian footballers
Serbian SuperLiga players
1977 births
Living people